Mikhail Aleksandrovich Rytov (born 4 October 1984) is a Russian professional football player.

Club career
He played 10 seasons in the Russian Football National League for 4 different clubs.

External links
 
 

1984 births
People from Vyksa
Living people
Russian footballers
Association football defenders
FC KAMAZ Naberezhnye Chelny players
FC Nizhny Novgorod (2007) players
FC Baltika Kaliningrad players
FC Tekstilshchik Ivanovo players
FC Khimik Dzerzhinsk players
FC Dynamo Bryansk players
Sportspeople from Nizhny Novgorod Oblast